Hippichthys spicifer, commonly known as bellybarred pipefish, banded freshwater pipefish, or blue spotted pipefish, is a species of pipefish of the family Syngnathidae. It is found in the Indo-Pacific, from the Red Sea and East Africa to Sri Lanka and Samoa. It is expected to feed on small crustaceans and mosquito larvae. This species is ovoviviparous, with males brooding eggs in a brood pouch before giving birth to live young. It is reproductively active all year, with males and females reaching sexual maturity at  respectively. Brood size can vary significantly, from 114 to 1764, with an average of 604.4 plus or minus 322.8.

Identification
H. spicifer has a brownish to red back, a bluish stomach, and fine brown and pale mottling. The underside of the front of the body usually has a series of brown to blue bars interspersed with yellow to white bars. The lower part of the head usually has black dots.

References

Further reading
IUCN Seahorse, Pipefish & Stickleback Specialist Group

Fish described in 1838
Taxa named by Eduard Rüppell
spicifer
Freshwater fish